The Dacia Bigster is a concept SUV manufactured by the Romanian car manufacturer Dacia. It was unveiled in January 2021.

Overview
The Bigster concept car was presented on 14 January 2021 during the presentation of the "Renaulution" strategic plan by the new managing director of Renault, Luca de Meo. The Bigster receives the brand new Dacia logo on its grille formed by the letters "DC".

The Bigster Concept is based on the Renault's elongated CMF-B modular platform, notably from the Renault Clio V.

References

External links

 The official Dacia website

Bigster
Mid-size sport utility vehicles
Front-wheel-drive vehicles
All-wheel-drive vehicles
Bigster